AWG plc was a British holding company which is parent to Anglian Water. It was previously listed on the London Stock Exchange, and was a member of the FTSE 250 Index, but it is now owned by the Osprey Consortium. Its headquarters are in Huntingdon, Cambridgeshire.

History
Originally Anglian Water, it was one of the British regional water companies privatised in 1989.

Like many utility companies, AWG has attempted to diversify away from a core business which offers steady profits but has very limited potential for expansion, in its case through the acquisition in September 2000, of the Scottish support service and construction group Morrison Construction.

In March 2006, the construction division of the Morrison business was sold to Galliford Try for £42m. The remainder of the business was split into two divisions, Morrison Facilities Services and Morrison Utilities Services, and, in March 2008, AWG sold the Utility Services division to two private equity firms, Cognetas and Englefield Capital for £235 million.

AWG was acquired by the Osprey Consortium, made up of Canada Pension Plan Investment Board, Colonial First State, Industry Funds Management and 3i, in December 2006.

In 2012, AWG sold Morrison Facilities Services to Mears Group for £24m.

References

External links
Official site
Yahoo profile

Utilities of the United Kingdom
Companies based in Cambridgeshire
Renewable resource companies established in 1973
3i Group companies
Companies formerly listed on the London Stock Exchange
1973 establishments in England
British companies established in 1973